Club Life, Vol. 4 - New York City is a mixed compilation album by Dutch DJ/producer Tiësto. It is the fourth installment of his Club Life compilation series and it was released through Musical Freedom on 18 May 2015.

Track listing

 Someone Somewhere (Tiësto Edit) features uncredited production by John Christian and Rob Kleiner
 Butterflies features uncredited production by Sergio Popken
 Change Your World features uncredited production by Seven Lions
 Fighting For (Tiësto Edit) features uncredited production by John Christian

Charts

References

2015 compilation albums
Tiësto compilation albums